The 1957–58 Seattle Chieftains men's basketball team (now known as Redhawks) represented Seattle University during the 1957–58 NCAA University Division men's basketball season. Led by future top draft pick Elgin Baylor, Seattle was the runner-up in the NCAA tournament, falling to Kentucky in the finals in

Roster

Schedule and results

|-
!colspan=9 style=| Regular season

|-
!colspan=9 style=| NCAA tournament

NCAA tournament

West
Seattle 69, San Francisco 67
Seattle 66, California 62
Final Four
 Seattle 73, Kansas State 51
Kentucky 84, Seattle 72

NCAA Championship
The NCAA Final Four was played at Freedom Hall in Louisville,  Seattle had an integrated team, and played in front of an all-white crowd of 18,803. Elgin Baylor was the nation's second-best scorer (32.5) behind Cincinnati's Oscar Robertson. The Chieftains led Kentucky by 11 points in the first half, and were leading  with seven minutes in the game. Seattle lost the game  for a 

After the championship game, Baylor hinted that he might return for his senior season. Castellani had two recruits with him from the South Bend area, forwards Don Piasecki and Don Ogorek. The Chieftains also added a transfer from Indiana, guard Charlie Brown. The feeling was that the team would have a bright future.

Rankings

Awards and honors
 Elgin Baylor – NCAA Men's MOP Award, Helms Foundation College Basketball Player of the Year, Consensus First-team All-American

Team players drafted into the NBA

References

External links
 Sports Press Northwest – Wayback Machine – Seattle U.'s 1958 Final 4 run

Seattle Chieftains
NCAA Division I men's basketball tournament Final Four seasons
Seattle
Seattle Redhawks men's basketball seasons